The HTC Wildfire (also known as HTC Buzz) is a smartphone developed by the HTC Corporation, that was announced on 17 May 2010 and released in Europe in June of the same year. It is powered by a 528 MHz Qualcomm processor and runs the Android operating system, version 2.2. It includes a TFT LCD capacitive touchscreen and a 5-megapixel camera. It has been described as a "Mini HTC Desire", and is perceived to be a follow-up model to the previous year's Tattoo.

The CDMA version of HTC Wildfire (also known as HTC Bee) was released in 29 October 2010, replaces GSM and HSPA to CDMA and EVDO connection technologies. It appears with a bigger size than the previous version and the display appears in 256,000 colors.

Availability

It was being available via various mobile network operators in Europe, including the UK and Ireland.

In Australia, the carrier announced was Telstra. The Telstra branded HTC Wildfire is a special version supporting 850 MHz/2100 MHz UMTS, with the model number A3335.

In Taiwan, the carrier announced was Taiwan Mobile.

In Malaysia, the carrier announced was Maxis.

In Mexico, the carrier announced was Iusacell; however, it was incorrectly marked as the HTC Desire A.

It was being available in Russia from 22 July 2010.

In Turkey, availability is uncertain.

Name

The name "Wildfire" was decided in a poll on Facebook, which resulted in 50% of the votes for "Wildfire" and 24% for "Zeal" which came in second place.

Wildfire S

The HTC Wildfire S is a refresh version released a year later in 2011, which features many enhancements, including a screen with double the resolution of the Wildfire and RAM increased from 384 to 512 MB.

Wildfire X 
HTC Wildfire X, also named "HTC Wildfire Max" and "HTC Wildfire 10", was released on August 22nd, 2019, and manufactured by HTC Corporation and InOne Corporation. It has a 6.2" 720×1560 display, 3300 mAh non-replaceable battery, dual-SIM, microSD-expandable storage, and 12-Megapixel rear camera video recording with 1080p at 30fps. The variant with 32 GB internal storage has 3 GB of RAM, the variant with 128 GB internal storage has 4 GB RAM.

Software updates

HTC announced in June 2010 that the HTC Wildfire was on their list of phones to receive the Android 2.2 "Froyo" update. The update to Android 2.2 includes support for USB tethering, enhanced bluetooth support, multiple keyboard languages, Wi-Fi hotspot tethering and more. However, live wallpapers and Adobe Flash Player support in the browser will not be supported.

A leaked build of Android 2.2 and 2.2.1 subsequently surfaced from China and Europe respectively, but with limited language support. It was modified and released by developers on the XDA Forums. In addition to this, several unofficial builds based on AOSP 2.2.1 and 2.3 have also surfaced on XDA.

On the morning of 20 December 2010, the 2.2 update was released as a modified build of the HTC Glacier's code. Many customers were surprised at the news, some previously so much as speculating that it would not appear, as the majority of Wildfire users had been waiting in anticipation for the update (heightened by limited news on the subject from HTC) since mid-2010.

Customers with unlocked HTC Wildfires received the update first, followed by operator-locked users that received the update shortly after the original release.

Key software availability

See also
 Comparison of smartphones
 Galaxy Nexus

References

External links
HTC Wildfire forum

Android (operating system) devices
HTC smartphones
Mobile phones introduced in 2010
Discontinued smartphones
Mobile phones with user-replaceable battery

sk:High Tech Computer Corporation